In geography, statistics and archaeology, a settlement, locality or populated place is a community in which people live. The complexity of a settlement can range from a minuscule number of dwellings grouped together to the largest of cities with surrounding urbanized areas. Settlements may include hamlets, villages, towns and cities.  A settlement may have known historical properties such as the date or era in which it was first settled, or first settled by particular people.

In the field of geospatial predictive modeling, settlements are "a city, town, village or other agglomeration of buildings where people live and work".

A settlement conventionally includes its constructed facilities such as roads, enclosures, field systems, boundary banks and ditches, ponds, parks and woods, wind and water mills, manor houses, moats and churches.

History
The earliest geographical evidence of a human settlement was Jebel Irhoud, where early modern human remains of eight individuals date back to the Middle Paleolithic around 300,000 years ago.

The oldest remains that have been found of constructed dwellings are remains of huts that were made of mud and branches around 17,000 BC at the Ohalo site (now underwater) near the edge of the Sea of Galilee. The Natufians built houses, also in the Levant, around 10,000 BC. Remains of settlements such as villages become much more common after the invention of agriculture.

In landscape history 

Landscape history studies the form (morphology) of settlements – for example whether they are dispersed or nucleated. Urban morphology can thus be considered a special type of cultural-historical landscape studies. Settlements can be ordered by size, centrality or other factors to define a settlement hierarchy. A settlement hierarchy can be used for classifying settlement all over the world, although a settlement called a 'town' in one country might be a 'village' in other countries; or a 'large town' in some countries might be a 'city' in others.

Statistics

Australia 
Geoscience Australia defines a populated place as "a named settlement with a population of 200 or more persons".

The Committee for Geographical Names in Australasia used the term localities for rural areas, while the Australian Bureau of Statistics uses the term "urban centres/localities" for urban areas.

Bosnia and Herzegovina
The Agency for Statistics in Bosnia and Herzegovina uses the term "populated place""settled place" for rural (or urban as an administrative center of some Municipality/City), and "Municipality" and  "City" for urban areas.

Bulgaria 
The Bulgarian Government publishes a National Register of Populated places (NRPP).

Canada 
The Canadian government uses the term "populated place" in the Atlas of Canada, but does not define it.
Statistics Canada uses the term localities for historically named locations.

Croatia 
The Croatian Bureau of Statistics records population in units called settlements (naselja).

India 
The Census Commission of India has a special definition of census towns.

Ireland 
The  Central Statistics Office of the Republic of Ireland has a special definition of census towns.

Pakistan 
The Pakistan Bureau of Statistics records population in units of settlements called Tehsil – an administrative unit derived from the Mughal era.

Russia 

There are various types of inhabited localities in Russia.

Sweden 
Statistics Sweden uses the term localities (tätort) for various densely populated places. The common English-language translation is urban areas.

United Kingdom 
The UK Department for Communities and Local Government uses the term "urban settlement" to denote an urban area when analysing census information. The Registrar General for Scotland defines settlements as groups of one or more contiguous localities, which are determined according to population density and postcode areas. The Scottish settlements are used as one of several factors defining urban areas.

United States 
The United States Geological Survey (USGS) has a Geographic Names Information System that defines three classes of human settlement:
 Populated place − place or geographic area with clustered or scattered buildings and a permanent human population (city, settlement, town, village).  A populated place is usually not incorporated and by definition has no legal boundaries. However, a populated place may have a corresponding "civil" record, the legal boundaries of which may or may not coincide with the perceived populated place.
 Census − a statistical area delineated locally specifically for the tabulation of Census Bureau data (census designated place, census county division, unorganized territory, various types of American Indian/Alaska Native statistical areas).
 Civil − a political division formed for administrative purposes (borough, county, incorporated place, municipality, parish, town, township)."

Populated places may be specifically defined in the context of censuses and be different from general-purpose administrative entities, such as "place" as defined by the U.S. Census Bureau or census-designated places.

Geospatial modeling 
In the field of geospatial predictive modeling, settlements are "a city, town, village, or other agglomeration of buildings where people live and work".

The Global Human Settlement Layer (GHSL) framework produces global spatial information about the human presence on the planet over time. This in the form of built up maps, population density maps and settlement maps. This information is generated with evidence-based analytics and knowledge using new spatial data mining technologies. The framework uses heterogeneous data including global archives of fine-scale satellite imagery, census data, and volunteered geographic information. The data is processed fully automatically and generates analytics and knowledge reporting objectively and systematically about the presence of population and built-up infrastructures. The GHSL operates in an open and free data and methods access policy (open input, open method, open output).

Abandonment 

The term "Abandoned populated places" is a Feature Designation Name in databases sourced by the National Geospatial-Intelligence Agency and GeoNames.

Sometimes the structures are still easily accessible, such as in a ghost town, and these may become tourist attractions. Some places that have the appearance of a ghost town, however, may still be defined as populated places by government entities.

A town may become a ghost town because the economic activity that supported it has failed, because of a government action, such as the building of a dam that floods the town, or because of natural or human-caused disasters such as floods, uncontrolled lawlessness, or war. The term is sometimes used to refer to cities, towns, and neighborhoods that are still populated, but significantly less so than in years past.

See also 

 Administrative division
 Colony
 Human outpost
 Informal settlement
 List of Neolithic settlements
 Lost city
 Requirements for permanent settlements
 Settlement geography

References

External links 
 The Global Human Settlement Layer (GHSL) framework